The 2014 Tour de Feminin – O cenu Českého Švýcarska or 2014 Tour de Feminin – Krásná Lípa, is the 27th running of the Tour de Feminin – O cenu Českého Švýcarska  rated by the UCI as 2.2. Tour de Feminin – Krásná Lípa is a stage race based in the Czech Republic, which forms part of the 2014 women's road cycling calendar and will be held over five stages starting in Krásná Lípa, in the Ústí nad Labem Region and concluding back in Krásná Lípa. The race will run over four stages and one individual time trial.

Stages

Stage 1
10 July 2014 –  Krásná Lípa to Krásná Lípa,

Stage 2
11 July 2014 – Jiříkov to Jiříkov,

Stage 3
12 July 2014 – Bogatynia to Bogatynia, individual time trial (ITT)

Stage 4
12 July 2014 – Rumburk to Rumburk,

Stage 5
13 July 2014 – Varnsdorp to Krásná Lípa,

Classification progress

References

Tour de Feminin - O cenu Ceskeho Svycarska
Tour de Feminin - O cenu Ceskeho Svycarska
International cycle races hosted by the Czech Republic